Nicaragua has competed at the Pan American Games since the first edition of the multi-sport event in 1951. It has missed three Pan American Games (1955, 1963 and 1979).

Medal count

References

 
1967 in Nicaraguan sport